Hyde v. United States, 225 U.S. 347 (1912), is a United States Supreme Court criminal case interpreting attempt. The court held that for an act to be a criminal attempt, it must be so near the result that the danger of its success must be very large. The court wrote, "There must be a dangerous proximity to success."

References

External links
 

United States Supreme Court cases
United States Supreme Court cases of the White Court
1912 in United States case law